Stefan Atanasovski (born 8 September 1999) is a Macedonian handball player who plays for Mudhar.

References

External links

1999 births
Living people
Macedonian male handball players
Sportspeople from Skopje
RK Vardar players